The 1995 Speedway World Team Cup was the 36th edition of the FIM Speedway World Team Cup to determine the team world champions.

The final took place at the Stadion Miejski Polonii (Bydgoszcz) in Poland. Hans Nielsen (paired with Tommy Knudsen) won his tenth gold medal and in the process sent Denmark to their tenth title success and clear of England in the all time winners list.

Qualification

Group C

 June 4, 1995
  Togliatti

Ukraine and Latvia to Group B

Group B

 July 2, 1995
  Krsko

Norway and Ukraine to Group A

Group A

 August 26, 1995
  Pocking

Great Britain and Norway to Final

World Final
 September 24, 1995
  Bydgoszcz, Polonia Bydgoszcz Stadium

See also
 1995 Speedway Grand Prix

References

Speedway World Team Cup
World T